The men's 500 metres competition in short track speed skating at the 2022 Winter Olympics was held on 11 February (heats) and 13 February (finals), at the Capital Indoor Stadium in Beijing. Shaoang Liu of Hungary won the event, his first individual Olympic gold. Konstantin Ivliev, representing the Russian Olympic committee, won silver, his first Olympic medal. Steven Dubois of Canada won the bronze medal.

The defending champion is Wu Dajing.   The bronze medalist, Lim Hyo-jun, qualified for the Olympics as well but will be representing China rather than South Korea, which he represented in 2018. Shaoang Liu is the 2021 World Short Track Speed Skating champion at the 500 m  distance. Semion Elistratov and Pietro Sighel are the silver and bronze medalists, respectively. Many top athletes did not participate in the championship, however. Shaolin Sándor Liu was leading the 2021–22 ISU Short Track Speed Skating World Cup at the 500 m distance with four races completed before the Olympics, followed by Wu Dajing and Ren Ziwei. Wu Dajing is also the world and Olympic record holder.

Qualification

Countries were assigned quotas based on their performance during the 2021–22 ISU Short Track Speed Skating World Cup, with the top 32 athletes (maximum of three per country qualifying quotas. If a NOC declined a quota spot, it was distributed to the next available athlete, only if the maximum quota of 56 athletes per gender was not surpassed.

Records
Prior to this competition, the existing world and Olympic records were as follows.

Results

Heats

Quarterfinals

Semifinals

Finals

Final B

Final A

References

Men's short track speed skating at the 2022 Winter Olympics